Korach or Korah ( Qoraḥ — the name "Korah," which in turn means baldness, ice, hail, or frost, the second word, and the first distinctive word, in the parashah) is the 38th weekly Torah portion (parashah) in the annual Jewish cycle of Torah reading and the fifth in the Book of Numbers.  It tells of Korah's failed attempt to overthrow Moses.

It comprises . The parashah is made up of 5,325 Hebrew letters, 1,409 Hebrew words, 95 verses, and 184 lines in a Torah Scroll (Sefer Torah). Jews generally read it in June or July.

Readings

First reading — Numbers 16:1–13
In the first reading (aliyah), the Levite Korah son of Izhar joined with the Reubenites Dathan and Abiram, sons of Eliab, and On, son of Peleth and 250 chieftains of the Israelite community to rise up against Moses. Korah and his band asked Moses and Aaron why they placed themselves above the rest of the community, for the entire congregation is holy. Moses told Korah and his band to take their fire pans and put fire and incense on them before God. Moses sent for Dathan and Abiram, but they refused to come.

Second reading — Numbers 16:14–19
In the second reading (aliyah), the next day, Korah and his band took their fire pans and gathered the whole community against Moses and Aaron at the entrance of the Tabernacle.

Third reading — Numbers 16:20–17:8
In the third reading (aliyah), the Presence of the Lord appeared to the whole community, and God told Moses and Aaron to stand back so that God could annihilate the others. Moses and Aaron fell on their faces and implored God not to punish the whole community. God told Moses to instruct the community to move away from the tents of Korah, Dathan, and Abiram, and they did so, while Dathan, Abiram, and their families stood at the entrance of their tents. Moses told the Israelites that if these men were to die of natural causes, then God did not send Moses, but if God caused the earth to swallow them up, then these men had spurned God. Just as Moses finished speaking, the earth opened and swallowed them, their households, and all Korah's people, and the Israelites fled in terror. And a fire consumed the 250 men offering the incense. God told Moses to order Eleazar the priest to remove the fire pans — as they had become sacred — and have them made into plating for the altar to remind the Israelites that no one other than Aaron's offspring should presume to offer incense to God. The next day, the whole Israelite community railed against Moses and Aaron for bringing death upon God's people. A cloud covered the Tabernacle and the God's Presence appeared.

Fourth reading — Numbers 17:9–15
In the fourth reading (aliyah), God told Moses to remove himself and Aaron from the community, so that God might annihilate them, and they fell on their faces. Moses told Aaron to take the fire pan, put fire from the altar and incense on it, and take it to the community to make expiation for them and to stop a plague that had begun, and Aaron did so. Aaron stood between the dead and the living and halted the plague, but not before 14,700 had died.

Fifth reading — Numbers 17:16–24
In the fifth reading (aliyah), God told Moses to collect a staff from the chieftain of each of the 12 tribes, inscribe each man's name on his staff, inscribe Aaron's name on the staff of Levi, and deposit the staffs in the Tent of Meeting. The next day, Moses entered the Tent and Aaron's staff had sprouted, blossomed, and borne almonds.

Sixth reading — Numbers 17:25–18:20

In the sixth reading (aliyah), God instructed Moses to put Aaron's staff before the Ark of the Covenant to be kept as a lesson to rebels to end their mutterings against God. But the Israelites cried to Moses, "We are doomed to perish!" God spoke to Aaron and said that he and his dynasty would be responsible for the Tent of Meeting and the priesthood and accountable for anything which went wrong in the performance of their priestly duties. God assigned the Levites to Aaron to aid in the performance of these duties. God prohibited any outsider from intruding on the priests as they discharged the duties connected with the Shrine, on pain of death. And God gave Aaron and the priests all the sacred donations and first fruits as a perquisite for all time for them and their families to eat. God gave them olive oil, wine, grain. The priestly covenant was described as a "covenant of salt", but God also told Aaron that the priests would have no territorial share among the Israelites, as God was their portion and their share.

Seventh reading — Numbers 18:21–32
In the seventh reading (aliyah), God gave the Levites all the tithes in Israel as their share in return for the services of the Tent of Meeting, but they too would have no territorial share among the Israelites. God told Moses to instruct the Levites to set aside one-tenth of the tithes they received as a gift to God.

Readings according to the triennial cycle
Jews who read the Torah according to the triennial cycle of Torah reading read the parashah according to the following schedule:

In inner-biblical interpretation
The parashah has parallels or is discussed in these Biblical sources:

Numbers chapter 16
And similarly, in 2 Samuel  and 1 Chronicles , David asked why God punished all the people with pestilence.  and 20 answer that God will punish only the individual who sins, and  affirms that God will judge every person according to that person's acts.

Numbers chapter 18

In early nonrabbinic interpretation
The parashah has parallels or is discussed in these early nonrabbinic sources:

Numbers chapter 16
Pseudo-Philo reported that God commanded Moses about the tassels, and then Korah and the 200 men with him rebelled, asking why that unbearable law had been imposed on them.

The first-century Roman-Jewish scholar Josephus wrote that Korah was an Israelite of principal account, both by family and wealth, who was able to speak well and could easily persuade the people. Korah envied the great dignity of Moses, as he was of the same tribe as Moses and he thought he better deserved honor on account of his great riches.

Josephus wrote that Moses called on God to punish those who had endeavored to deal unjustly with the people, but to save the multitude who followed God's commandments, for God knew that it would not be just that the whole body of the Israelites should suffer punishment for the wickedness of the unjust.

In classical rabbinic interpretation
The parashah is discussed in these rabbinic sources from the era of the Mishnah and the Talmud:

Numbers chapter 16
The Jerusalem Talmud told that after hearing the law of tassels, Korah made some garments that were completely dyed blue, went to Moses, and asked Moses whether a garment that was already completely blue nonetheless had to have a blue corner tassel. When Moses answered that it did, Korah said that the Torah was not of Divine origin, Moses was not a prophet, and Aaron was not a high priest.

A Midrash taught that  traces Korah's descent back only to Levi, not to Jacob, because Jacob said of the descendants of Simeon and Levi

The Midrash thus taught that the saying, "Woe to the wicked and woe to his neighbor!" applies to Dathan and Abiram.  reports that the descendants of Kohath, among whom Korah was numbered, lived on the south side of the Tabernacle. And  reports that the descendants of Reuben, among whom Dathan and Abiram were numbered, lived close by, as they also lived on the south side of the Tabernacle. Similarly, a Midrash taught that because Reuben, Simeon, and Gad were close to Korah, they were all quarrelsome men; and the sons of Gad and the sons of Simeon were also contentious people.

The Midrash answered that Korah took issue with Moses because Moses had (as  reports) appointed Elizaphan the son of Uzziel as prince of the Kohathites, and Korah was (as  reports) son of Uzziel's older brother Izhar, and thus had a claim to leadership prior to Elizaphan. Because Moses appointed the son of Korah's father's youngest brother, Uzziel, the leader, to be greater than Korah, Korah decided to oppose Moses and nullify everything that he did.

As the three Hebrew consonants that spell Korah's name also spell the Hebrew word for "bald" (kereach), the Gemara deduced that he was called Korah because he caused a bald spot to be formed among the Israelites when the earth swallowed his followers. As the name Izhar in  derived from the same Hebrew root as the word "noon" (tzohorayim), the Gemara deduced from "son of Izhar" that Korah was a son who brought upon himself anger hot as the noon sun. As the name Kohath in  derived from the same Hebrew root as the word for "set on edge" (kihah), the Gemara deduced from "son of Kohath" that Korah was a son who set his ancestors' teeth on edge. The Gemara deduced from the words "son of Levi" in  that Korah was a son who was escorted to Gehenna. "Let my soul not come into their council" referred to the spies, and "unto their assembly let my glory not be united" referred to Korah's assembly. As the name Dathan in  derived from the same Hebrew root as the word "law" (dat), the Gemara deduced from Dathan's name that he violated God's law. And as the name Reuben derived from the Hebrew words "see" (reu) and "understand" (mavin), the Gemara deduced from the reference to On as a "son of Reuben" in that On was a son who saw and understood.

 reports that the Reubenite On son of Peleth joined Korah's conspiracy, but the text does not mention On again. Rav explained that On's wife saved him, arguing to him that no matter whether Moses or Korah prevailed, On would remain just a disciple. On replied that he had sworn to participate. So On's wife got him drunk with wine, and laid him down in their tent. Then she sat at the entrance of their tent and loosened her hair, so that whoever came to summon him saw her and retreated at the sight of her immodestly loosened hair. The Gemara taught that  refers to On's wife when it says: "Every wise woman builds her house."

The Mishnah in Pirkei Avot deduced that the controversy of Korah and his followers was not for the sake of Heaven, and thus was destined not to result in permanent change. The Mishnah contrasted Korah's argument to those between Hillel and Shammai, which the Mishnah taught were controversies for the sake of Heaven, destined to result in something permanent.

Reading , “Cut not off the tribe of the families of the Kohathites from among the Levites,” Rabbi Abba bar Aibu noted that it would have been enough for the text to mention the family of Kohath, and asked why  also mentions the whole tribe. Rabbi Abba bar Aibu explained that God (in the words of ), “declar[es] the end from the beginning,” and provides beforehand for things that have not yet occurred. God foresaw that Korah, who would descend from the families of Kohath, would oppose Moses (as reported in ) and that Moses would beseech God that the earth should swallow them up (as reflected in ). So God told Moses to note that it was (in the words of ) “to be a memorial to the children of Israel, to the end that no common man . . . draw near to burn incense . . . as the Lord spoke to him by the hand of Moses.” The Midrash asked why then  adds the potentially superfluous words “to him,” and replied that it is to teach that God told Moses that God would listen to his prayer concerning Korah but not concerning the whole tribe. Therefore,  says, “Cut not off the tribe of the families of the Kohathites from among the Levites.”

Rabbi Simeon bar Abba in the name of Rabbi Joḥanan taught that every time Scripture uses the expression “and it was” (vayehi), it intimates the coming of either trouble or joy.  If it intimates trouble, there is no trouble to compare with it, and if it itimatres joy, there is no joy to compare with it.  Rabbi Samuel bar Nahman made a distinction:  In every instance where Scripture employs “and it was” (vayehi), it introduces trouble, while when Scripture employs “and it shall be” (ve-hayah), it introduces joy.  The Sages raised an objection to Rabbi Samuel's view, noting that to introduce the offerings of the princes,  says, “And he that presented his offering . . . was (vayehi),” and surely that was a positive thing.  Rabbi Samuel replied that the occasion of the princes’ gifts did not indicate joy, because it was manifest to God that the princes would join with Korah in his dispute (as reported in ).  Rabbi Judah ben Rabbi Simon said in the name of Rabbi Levi ben Parta that the case could be compared to that of a member of the palace who committed a theft in the bathhouse, and the attendant, while afraid of disclosing his name, nevertheless made him known by describing him as a certain young man dressed in white.  Similarly, although  does not explicitly mention the names of the princes who sided with Korah in his dispute,  nevertheless refers to them when it says, “They were princes of the congregation, the elect men of the assembly, men of renown,” and this recalls  , “These were the elect of the congregation, the princes of the tribes of their fathers . . . ,” where the text lists their names.  They were the “men of renown” whose names were mentioned in connection with the standards; as  says, “These are the names of the men who shall stand with you, of Reuben, Elizur the son of Shedeur; of Simeon, Shelumiel the son of Zurishaddai . . . .”

It was taught in a Baraita that King Ptolemy brought together 72 elders and placed them in 72 separate rooms, without telling them why he had brought them together, and asked each of them to translate the Torah. God then prompted each of them to conceive the same idea and write a number of cases in which the translation did not follow the Masoretic Text, including reading  to say, "I have taken not one valuable of theirs" (substituting "valuable" for "donkey" to prevent the impression that Moses may have taken any other items).

Reading , a Midrash taught that in 18 verses, Scripture places Moses and Aaron (the instruments of Israel's deliverance) on an equal footing (reporting that God spoke to both of them alike), and thus there are 18 benedictions in the Amidah.

Similarly, the Gemara cited  to support the proposition that we need ten people in expressions of sanctity. The connotation of ten associated with the word “among” in the portion of Korah was, in turn, inferred by means of another verbal analogy between the word “congregation” written there and the word “congregation” written in reference to the ten spies who slandered the Land of Israel, as  says, “How long shall I bear with this evil congregation?” In the case of the spies, it was a congregation of ten people, as there were twelve spies altogether, and Joshua and Caleb were not included in the evil congregation. So, the Gemara reasoned, in the case of Korah, the reference must also be to a congregation of ten people.

His shipmates asked him what he was doing. He replied that what he was doing would not matter to them, as he was boring under his own place. And they replied that the water would come up and flood the ship for them all.

Reading Song of Songs , "I went down into the garden of nuts," to apply to Israel, a Midrash taught that just as when one takes a nut from a stack of nuts, all the rest come toppling over, so if a single Jew is smitten, all Jews feel it, as  says, "Shall one man sin, and will You be angry with all the congregation?"

The Midrash taught that Moses told God that a mortal king who is confronted with an uprising in a province of his kingdom would send his legions to kill all the inhabitants of the province — both innocent and the guilty — because the king would not know who rebelled and who did not. But God knows the hearts and thoughts of each and every person, knows who sinned and who did not, and knows who rebelled and who did not. The Midrash taught that God replied that they had spoken well, and God would make known who had sinned and who had not.

Rabbi Berekiah read  to teach how inexorably destructive dispute is. For the Heavenly Court usually does not impose a penalty until a sinner reaches the age of 20. But in Korah's dispute, even one-day-old babies were consumed by the fire and swallowed up by the earth. For  says, "with their wives, and their sons, and their little ones."

Rabbi Akiva interpreted  to teach that Korah's assembly will have no portion in the World To Come, as the words "the earth closed upon them" reported that they died in this world, and the words "they perished from among the assembly" implied that they died in the next world, as well. But Rabbi Eliezer disagreed, reading  to speak of Korah's assembly when it said: "The Lord kills, and makes alive; He brings down to the grave, and brings up." The Gemara cited a Tanna who concurred with Rabbi Eliezer's position: Rabbi Judah ben Bathyra likened Korah's assembly to a lost article, which one seeks, as Psalm  said: "I have gone astray like a lost sheep; seek Your servant."

The words "In the wilderness" alludes to the Golden Calf, as  reports. "On the plain" alludes to how they complained about not having water, as  reports. "Facing Suf" alludes to how they rebelled at the Sea of Reeds (or some say to the idol that Micah made). Rabbi Judah cited , "They rebelled at the Sea of Reeds." "Between Paran" alludes to the Twelve Spies, as  says, "Moses sent them from the wilderness of Paran." "And Tophel" alludes to the frivolous words (tiphlot) they said about the manna. "Lavan" alludes to Koraḥ's mutiny. "Ḥatzerot" alludes to the quails. And "Di-zahav" alludes to when Aaron said to them: "Enough (dai) of this golden (zahav) sin that you have committed with the Calf!" But Rabbi Eliezer ben Ya'akov said it means "Terrible enough (dai) is this sin that Israel was punished to last from now until the resurrection of the dead."

A Tanna in the name of Rabbi deduced from the words "the sons of Korah did not die" in  that Providence set up a special place for them to stand on high in Gehinnom. There, Korah's sons sat and sang praises to God. Rabbah bar bar Hana told that once when he was travelling, an Arab showed him where the earth swallowed Korah's congregation. Rabbah bar bar Hana saw two cracks in the ground from which smoke issued. He took a piece of wool, soaked it in water, attached it to the point of his spear, and passed it over the cracks, and the wool was singed. The Arab told Rabbah bar bar Hana to listen, and he heard them saying, "Moses and his Torah are true, but Korah's company are liars." The Arab told Rabbah bar bar Hana that every 30 days Gehinnom caused them to return for judgment, as if they were being stirred like meat in a pot, and every 30 days they said those same words.

Rabbi Judah taught that the same fire that descended from heaven settled on the earth, and did not again return to its former place in heaven, but it entered the Tabernacle. That fire came forth and devoured all the offerings that the Israelites brought in the wilderness, as  does not say, "And there descended fire from heaven," but "And there came forth fire from before the Lord." This was the same fire that came forth and consumed the sons of Aaron, as  says, "And there came forth fire from before the Lord." And that same fire came forth and consumed the company of Korah, as  says, "And fire came forth from the Lord." And the Pirke De-Rabbi Eliezer taught that no person departs from this world until some of that fire, which rested among humanity, passes over that person, as  says, "And the fire rested."

Numbers chapter 17
Rav taught that anyone who persists in a quarrel transgresses the commandment of  that one be not as Korah and his company.

Rabbi Joshua ben Levi explained how, as  reports, Moses knew what to tell Aaron what to do to make atonement for the people, to stand between the dead and the living, and to check the plague. Rabbi Joshua ben Levi taught that when Moses ascended on high (as  reports), the ministering angels asked God what business one born of woman had among them. God told them that Moses had come to receive the Torah. The angels questioned why God was giving to flesh and blood the secret treasure that God had hidden for 974 generations before God created the world. God told Moses to answer the angels. Moses asked God what was written in the Torah. In , God said, "I am the Lord your God, Who brought you out of the Land of Egypt." So Moses asked the angels whether the angels had gone down to Egypt or were enslaved to Pharaoh. As the angels had not, Moses asked them why then God should give them the Torah. Again,  says, "You shall have no other gods," so Moses asked the angels whether they lived among peoples that engage in idol worship. Again,  (20:8 in the NJPS) says, "Remember the Sabbath day, to keep it holy," so Moses asked the angels whether they performed work from which they needed to rest. Again,  (20:7 in the NJPS) says, "You shall not take the name of the Lord your God in vain," so Moses asked the angels whether there were any business dealings among them in which they might swear oaths. Again,  (20:12 in the NJPS) says, "Honor your father and your mother," so Moses asked the angels whether they had fathers and mothers. Again,  (20:13 in the NJPS) says, "You shall not murder; you shall not commit adultery; you shall not steal," so Moses asked the angels whether there was jealousy among them and whether the Evil Tempter was among them. Immediately, the angels conceded that God's plan was correct, and each angel felt moved to love Moses and give him gifts. Even the Angel of Death confided his secret to Moses, and that is how Moses knew what to do when, as  reports, Moses told Aaron what to do to make atonement for the people, to stand between the dead and the living, and to check the plague.

Numbers chapter 18
The Gemara taught that in the north of the Temple was the Chamber of the Spark, built like a veranda (open on one or more sides) with a doorway to the non-sacred part, and there the priests kept watch in a chamber above and the Levites below. The Rabbis noted that  speaks of "your [Aaron's] service" (and watching was primarily a priestly function). The Gemara rejected the possibility that  might have referred to the Levites' service (of carrying the sacred vessels), noting that  addresses the Levites' service when it says, "And they shall be joined to you and keep the charge of the Tent of Meeting."

Rabbi Jonathan found evidence for the Levites' singing role at Temple services from the warning of  "That they [the Levites] do not die, neither they, nor you [Aaron, the priest]." Just as  warned about priestly duties at the altar, so (Rabbi Jonathan reasoned)  must also address the Levites' duties in the altar service.
But Abaye reported a tradition that a singing Levite who did his colleague's work at the gate incurred the death penalty, as  says, "And those who were to pitch before the Tabernacle eastward before the Tent of Meeting toward the sun-rising, were Moses and Aaron, . . . and the stranger who drew near was to be put to death." Abaye argued that the "stranger" in  could not mean a non-priest, for  had mentioned that rule already (and Abaye believed that the Torah would not state anything twice). Rather, reasoned Abaye,  must mean a "stranger" to a particular job. It was told, however, that Rabbi Joshua ben Hananyia once tried to assist Rabbi Joḥanan ben Gudgeda (both of whom were Levites) in the fastening of the Temple doors, even though Rabbi Joshua was a singer, not a door-keeper.

A non-Jew asked Shammai to convert him to Judaism, on condition that Shammai appoint him High Priest. Shammai pushed him away with a builder's ruler. The non-Jew then went to Hillel, who converted him. Hillel answered that it applied even to David, King of Israel, who had not been a priest. Thereupon the convert reasoned a fortiori that if the injunction applied to all (non-priestly) Israelites, whom in  God had called "my firstborn," how much more so would the injunction apply to a mere convert, who came among the Israelites with just his staff and bag. Then the convert returned to Shammai, quoted the injunction, and remarked on how absurd it had been for him to ask Shammai to appoint him High Priest.

In , God designated for Aaron and the priests “the heave offering (terumat) of their gift.” The Mishnah taught that a generous person would give one part out of forty.  The House of Shammai said one out of thirty.  The average person was to give one out of fifty.  A stingy person would give one out of sixty.

Rabban Simeon ben Gamaliel taught that any baby who lives 30 days is not a nonviable, premature birth (nefel), because  says, "And those that are to be redeemed of them from a month old shall you redeem," and as the baby must be redeemed, it follows that the baby is viable.

In medieval Jewish interpretation
The parashah is discussed in these medieval Jewish sources:

Numbers chapter 16
Baḥya ibn Paquda taught that because God showed special goodness to a certain family among families in the appointment of the priesthood and the Levites, God charged them with additional duties. But whoever among them rebels against God falls from those high degrees in this world, and will suffer severe pain in the World To Come, as was seen from what befell Korah and his company.

But the 12th century Spanish commentator Abraham ibn Ezra taught that the words "God of the spirits" just explain the word "God," indicating that God could destroy the congregation because God had their spirits in God's hand. Ibn Ezra acknowledged that some say that "God of the spirits" means that God has the power to investigate human souls, and that God knew that one man — Korah — alone sinned and caused the others to sin. But Ibn Ezra wrote that he believed that the words "Separate yourselves from among this congregation" in  refer to Korah and his congregation — and not to the entire congregation of Israel — and that God destroyed Korah's congregation.

Numbers chapter 18
Maimonides taught that it is a positive commandment for every Jewish man to redeem his son who is the firstborn of a Jewish mother, as  says, "All first issues of the womb are mine," and  says, "And you shall surely redeem a firstborn man." Maimonides taught that a mother is not obligated to redeem her son. If a father fails to redeem his son, when the son comes of age, he is obligated to redeem himself. If it is necessary for a man to redeem both himself and his son, he should redeem himself first and then his son. If he only has enough money for one redemption, he should redeem himself. A person who redeems his son recites the blessing: "Blessed are You . . . who sanctified us with His commandments and commanded us concerning the redemption of a son." Afterwards, he recites the shehecheyanu blessing and then gives the redemption money to the Cohen. If a man redeems himself, he should recite the blessing: "Blessed . . . who commanded us to redeem the firstborn" and he should recite the shehecheyanu blessing. The father may pay the redemption in silver or in movable property that has financial worth like that of silver coins. If the Cohen desires to return the redemption to the father, he may. The father should not, however, give it to the Cohen with the intent that he return it. The father must give it to the Cohen with the resolution that he is giving him a present without any reservations. Cohens and Levites are exempt from the redemption of their firstborn, as they served as the redemption of the Israelites' firstborn in the desert. A baby born by Caesarian section and any subsequent birth are exempt: the first because it did not emerge from the womb, and the second, because it was preceded by another birth. The obligation for redemption takes effect when the baby completes 30 days of life, as  says, "And those to be redeemed should be redeemed from the age of a month."

In modern interpretation
The parashah is discussed in these modern sources:

Numbers chapter 16
Forcing people to put a special blue tassel on their clothes, ancient interpreters suggested Korah must have argued, was an intolerable intrusion into their lives. Korah asked why, if someone's whole garment was already dyed blue, that person needed to add an extra blue thread to the corner tassel. But this question, ancient interpreters implied, was really a metaphorical version of Korah's complaint in  "Everyone in the congregation [of Levites] is holy, and the Lord is in their midst. So why then do you exalt yourselves above the assembly of the Lord?" In other words, Korah asserted that all Levites were part of the same garment and all blue, and asked why Moses and Aaron thought that they were special just because they were the corner thread. In saying this, Kugel argued, Korah set a pattern for would-be revolutionaries thereafter to seek to bring down the ruling powers with the taunt: "What makes you better than the rest of us?" Kugel wrote that ancient interpreters thus taught that Korah was not really interested in changing the system, but merely in taking it over. Korah was thus a dangerous demagogue.

Plaut wrote that the Korah story appears to reflect a struggle for priestly privilege in which Korah's people, originally full priests and singers, were after a power struggle reduced to doorkeepers. The story of the rebellion of Dathan, Abiram, and members of the tribe of Reuben, Plaut wrote, may represent the memory of an intertribal struggle in which the originally important tribe of Reuben was dislodged from its original preeminence.

Plaut noted, however, that  indicates some dissatisfaction rife among the Israelites. Plaut concluded that by not backing Moses and Aaron, the people exposed themselves to divine retribution.

But subsequent occurrences of "community" seem to point to the whole Israelite people, so Alter suggested that Moses and Aaron may have feared that God was exhibiting another impulse to destroy the entire Israelite population and start over again with the two brothers. Professor Nili Fox of Hebrew Union College-Jewish Institute of Religion and Terence Fretheim, Professor Emeritus at Luther Seminary, shared the latter view. Similarly, Fretheim reported that Moses and Aaron interceded arguing that not all should bear the consequences for one person. In Fretheim's view, God responded positively, separating the congregation from the rebels and their families.

Numbers chapter 18

Milgrom surmised that this may reflect an ancient rule where the firstborn was expected to care for the burial and worship of his deceased parents. Milgrom dismissed as without support the theory that the firstborn was originally offered as a sacrifice.

In April 2014, the Committee on Jewish Law and Standards of Conservative Judaism ruled that women are now equally responsible for observing commandments as men have been. The Committee thus concluded that mothers and fathers are equally responsible for the redemption of their first-born sons and daughters.

Plaut reported that most Reform Jews have abandoned the ceremony of redemption of the first-born as inconsistent with Reform Judaism's rejection of matters relating to priestly privilege and special status based upon one's parentage or sibling birth order.

 reports that a shekel equals 20 gerahs. This table translates units of weight used in the Bible:

Commandments
According to Sefer ha-Chinuch, there are 5 positive and 4 negative commandments in the parashah.
To guard the Temple area
No Levite must do another's work of either a Kohen or a Levite
One who is not a Kohen must not serve in the sanctuary
Not to leave the Temple unguarded
To redeem the firstborn sons and give the money to a Kohen
Not to redeem the firstborn of a kosher domestic animal
The Levites must work in the Temple
To set aside a tithe each planting year and give it to a Levite
The Levite must set aside a tenth of his tithe

In the liturgy

Haftarah

Notes

Further reading
The parashah has parallels or is discussed in these sources:

Biblical
 (firstborn);  (firstborn);  (firstborn).
 (firstborn);  (Korach, Dathan, Abiram).
 (firstborn).
 (not having taken a donkey).
 (firstborn).
 (rod blossomed);  (elders burning incense);  (individual responsibility).

Early nonrabbinic
Pseudo-Philo 16:1–17:4.
Josephus, Antiquities of the Jews 4:2:1–4, 3:1–4, 4:1–2, 4. Circa 93–94. In, e.g., The Works of Josephus: Complete and Unabridged, New Updated Edition. Translated by William Whiston, pages 102–07. Peabody, Massachusetts: Hendrickson Publishers, 1987. .
Jude  (Korah's rebellion).
Pausanias. Description of Greece, 2:31:10. Greece, 2nd Century C.E. (After Heracles leaned his club against the image of Hermes, the club took root and grew.).
Qur'an: 28:76–82; 29:39; 40:24–25. Arabia, circa 609–632. In, e.g., The Meaning of the Holy Qur'an. Translated by Abdullah Yusuf Ali, pages 981–84, 996, 1211-12. Beltsville, Maryland: Amana Publications, 10th edition, 1997. . And in The Qur'an With Annotated Interpretation in Modern English. Translated by Ali Ünal, pages 815–17, 828, 965. Clifton, New Jersey: Tughra Books, 2015. . (In the Qur'an, Korah is called Qarun.)

Classical rabbinic
Mishnah: Demai 1:1–7:8; Terumot 1:1–11:10; Challah 1:3; 4:9; Bikkurim 1:1–3:12; Chagigah 1:4; Sanhedrin 9:6; 10:3; Avot 5:6, 17; Bekhorot 8:8. Land of Israel, circa 200 C.E. In, e.g., The Mishnah: A New Translation. Translated by Jacob Neusner, pages 36–49, 93–120, 148, 157, 329, 345–53, 604–05, 686, 688, 806. New Haven: Yale University Press, 1988. .
Tosefta: Demai 1:1–8:24; Terumot 1:1–10:18; Maaser Sheni 3:11; Challah 2:7, 9; Shabbat 15:7; Chagigah 3:19; Sotah 7:4; Sanhedrin 13:9; Bekhorot 1:5. Land of Israel, circa 300 C.E. In, e.g., The Tosefta: Translated from the Hebrew, with a New Introduction. Translated by Jacob Neusner, volume 1, pages 77–202, 313, 339, 414, 677, 861; volume 2, pages 1190, 1469. Peabody, Massachusetts: Hendrickson Publishers, 2002. .
Jerusalem Talmud: Demai 1a–77b; Terumot 1a–107a; Maaser Sheni 4a, 5a, 53b–54a; Challah 9b, 23b, 29a, 33a; Orlah 18a, 20a; Bikkurim 1a–26b; Pesachim 42b, 58a; Yoma 11a; Yevamot 51b–52a, 65b, 73b–74a; Ketubot 36a; Gittin 27b; Sanhedrin 11a. Tiberias, Land of Israel, circa 400 CE. In, e.g., Talmud Yerushalmi. Edited by Chaim Malinowitz, Yisroel Simcha Schorr, and Mordechai Marcus, volumes 4, 7–8, 10–12, 18–19, 21, 30–31, 39. Brooklyn: Mesorah Publications, 2006–2016. And In, e.g., The Jerusalem Talmud: A Translation and Commentary. Edited by Jacob Neusner and translated by Jacob Neusner, Tzvee Zahavy, B. Barry Levy, and Edward Goldman. Peabody, Massachusetts: Hendrickson Publishers, 2009. .
Genesis Rabbah 19:2; 22:10; 26:7; 43:9. Land of Israel, 5th century. In, e.g., Midrash Rabbah: Genesis. Translated by Harry Freedman and Maurice Simon, volume 1, pages 149, 189–90, 217–19, 358–59; volume 2, pages 528, 656–57, 817, 899, 952–53, 980. London: Soncino Press, 1939. .
Mekhilta of Rabbi Simeon 19:3:2; 43:1:13; 46:2:4; 79:4:2; 84:1:9. Land of Israel, 5th century. In, e.g., Mekhilta de-Rabbi Shimon bar Yohai. Translated by W. David Nelson, pages 77, 182, 199, 367, 377. Philadelphia: Jewish Publication Society, 2006. .

Babylonian Talmud: Berakhot 21b, 45a, 47a–b; Shabbat 25a, 26a, 89a, 127b, 135b; Eruvin 19a, 31b; Pesachim 23a, 34a, 35b, 54a, 64b, 73a, 121b; Yoma 24a, 27a, 44a, 45b, 52b, 74b; 9a; Beitzah 3b, 12b–13b; Rosh Hashanah 12b; 9b, 23b; Moed Katan 5a–b, 12a, 13a, 16a, 18b, 28a; Chagigah 7b, 10b, 11b; Yevamot 74a, 85b–86b, 89b, 99b; Ketubot 8b, 72a, 102a; Nedarim 7b, 12b, 18b, 38a, 39b, 64b; Nazir 4b; Sotah 2a, 13b, 15a; Gittin 11b, 23b, 25a, 30b, 52a; Kiddushin 11b, 17a, 29a, 46b, 52b–53a; Bava Kamma 11b, 13a, 67a, 69b, 78a, 79a, 80a, 110b, 114a, 115b; Bava Metzia 6b, 22a, 56a, 71b, 88b, 102b; Bava Batra 74a, 84b, 112a, 118b, 143a; Sanhedrin 17a, 37b, 52a–b, 74b, 82b–84a, 90b, 108a, 109b–10a; Makkot 4a, 12a, 13a, 14b, 17a–b, 19a–b, 23b; Shevuot 4b, 17b, 39a; Avodah Zarah 15a, 24b; Horayot 12a; Zevachim 16a, 28a, 32a, 37a, 44b–45a, 49b, 57a, 60b, 63a, 73a, 81a, 88b, 91a, 97b, 102b; Menachot 9a, 19b, 21b, 23a, 37a, 54b, 58a, 73a, 77b, 83a, 84b, 99a; Chullin 68a, 99a, 120b, 130a, 131a–32b, 133b, 134b, 135b–36a; Bekhorot 3b–4b, 5b, 6b–7a, 10b, 11b–12b, 17a, 26b, 27b, 31b–33a, 34a, 47b, 49a, 50a, 51a–b, 53b, 54b, 56b, 58b–59a, 60a; Arakhin 4a, 11b, 16a, 28b–29a; Temurah 3a, 4b–5b, 8a, 21a–b, 24a; Keritot 4a, 5b; Meilah 8b; Tamid 26b; Niddah 26a, 29a. Sasanian Empire, 6th Century. In, e.g., Talmud Bavli. Edited by Yisroel Simcha Schorr, Chaim Malinowitz, and Mordechai Marcus, 72 vols. Brooklyn: Mesorah Pubs., 2006.

Medieval
Avot of Rabbi Natan, 36:3. Circa 700–900 C.E. In, e.g., The Fathers According to Rabbi Nathan. Translated by Judah Goldin, page 149. New Haven: Yale Univ. Press, 1955. . The Fathers According to Rabbi Nathan: An Analytical Translation and Explanation. Translated by Jacob Neusner, 217. Atlanta: Scholars Press, 1986. .

Tanna Devei Eliyahu. Seder Eliyyahu Rabbah 67, 77, 83, 106, 117. 10th Century. In, e.g., Tanna Debe Eliyyahu: The Lore of the School of Elijah. Translated by William G. Braude and Israel J. Kapstein, pages 150, 172, 183, 233, 256. Philadelphia: Jewish Publication Society, 1981. .
Midrash Tehillim 1:15; 19:1; 26:4; 24:7; 32:1; 45:1, 4; 46:3; 49:3; 90:5; 132:1, 3. 10th century. In, e.g., The Midrash on the Psalms. Translated by William G. Braude, volume 1, pages 20–22. New Haven: Yale University Press, 1959. LCCN 58-6535.
Rashi. Commentary. Numbers 16–18. Troyes, France, late 11th Century. In, e.g., Rashi. The Torah: With Rashi's Commentary Translated, Annotated, and Elucidated. Translated and annotated by Yisrael Isser Zvi Herczeg, volume 4, pages 189–224. Brooklyn: Mesorah Publications, 1997. .
Rashbam. Commentary on the Torah. Troyes, early 12th century. In, e.g., Rashbam's Commentary on Leviticus and Numbers: An Annotated Translation. Edited and translated by Martin I. Lockshin, pages 225–46. Providence: Brown Judaic Studies, 2001. .
Numbers Rabbah 18:1–23. 12th Century. In, e.g., Midrash Rabbah: Numbers. Translated by Judah J. Slotki. London: Soncino Press, 1939. .
Abraham ibn Ezra. Commentary on the Torah. Mid-12th century. In, e.g., Ibn Ezra's Commentary on the Pentateuch: Numbers (Ba-Midbar). Translated and annotated by H. Norman Strickman and Arthur M. Silver, pages 126–51. New York: Menorah Publishing Company, 1999. .

Maimonides. Mishneh Torah, Structure. Cairo, Egypt, circa 1170–1180.
Maimonides. Mishneh Torah: Hilchot Talmud Torah (The Laws of Torah Study), chapter 3, ¶ 13. Egypt, circa 1170–1180. In, e.g., Mishneh Torah: Hilchot De'ot: The Laws of Personality Development: and Hilchot Talmud Torah: The Laws of Torah Study. Translated by Za'ev Abramson and Eliyahu Touger, volume 2, pages 206–09. New York: Moznaim Publishing, 1989.
Maimonides. Mishneh Torah: Hilchot Matnot Aniyiim (The Laws of Gifts to the Poor), chapter 6, ¶ 2; Hilchot Terumot (The Laws of Priestly Offerings); Hilchot Ma'aser (The Laws of Tithes); Hilchot Bikkurim (The Laws of First Fruits); Hilchot Shemita V'Yovel (The Laws of the Sabbatical and Jubilee Years), chapter 13, ¶ 12. Egypt, circa 1170–1180. In, e.g., Mishneh Torah: Sefer Zeraim: The Book of Agricultural Ordinances. Translated by Eliyahu Touger, pages 154–55, 196–499, 600–715, 834–35. New York: Moznaim Publishing, 2005. .
Maimonides. Mishneh Torah: Hilchot Kli Hamikdash (The Laws of the Temple Utensils), chapter 3, ¶ 1. Egypt, circa 1170–1180. In, e.g., Mishneh Torah: Sefer Ha'Avodah: The Book of (Temple) Service. Translated by Eliyahu Touger, pages 148–51. New York: Moznaim Publishing, 2007. .
Maimonides. The Guide for the Perplexed, part 1, chapters 15, 20. Cairo, Egypt, 1190. In, e.g., Moses Maimonides. The Guide for the Perplexed. Translated by Michael Friedländer, pages 25, 29. New York: Dover Publications, 1956. .
Hezekiah ben Manoah. Hizkuni. France, circa 1240. In, e.g., Chizkiyahu ben Manoach. Chizkuni: Torah Commentary. Translated and annotated by Eliyahu Munk, volume 4, pages 933–50. Jerusalem: Ktav Publishers, 2013. .

Nachmanides. Commentary on the Torah. Jerusalem, circa 1270. In, e.g., Ramban (Nachmanides): Commentary on the Torah: Numbers. Translated by Charles B. Chavel, volume 4, pages 158–93. New York: Shilo Publishing House, 1975. .
Zohar part 3, pages 176a–178b. Spain, late 13th Century. In, e.g., The Zohar. Translated by Harry Sperling and Maurice Simon. 5 volumes. London: Soncino Press, 1934.
Jacob ben Asher (Baal Ha-Turim). Rimze Ba'al ha-Turim. Early 14th century. In, e.g., Baal Haturim Chumash: Bamidbar/Numbers. Translated by Eliyahu Touger; edited and annotated by Avie Gold, volume 4, pages 1547–79. Brooklyn: Mesorah Publications, 2003. .
Jacob ben Asher. Perush Al ha-Torah. Early 14th century. In, e.g., Yaakov ben Asher. Tur on the Torah. Translated and annotated by Eliyahu Munk, volume 3, pages 1101–20. Jerusalem: Lambda Publishers, 2005. .
Isaac ben Moses Arama. Akedat Yizhak (The Binding of Isaac). Late 15th century. In, e.g., Yitzchak Arama. Akeydat Yitzchak: Commentary of Rabbi Yitzchak Arama on the Torah. Translated and condensed by Eliyahu Munk, volume 2, pages 728–41. New York, Lambda Publishers, 2001. .

Modern
Isaac Abravanel. Commentary on the Torah. Italy, between 1492–1509. In, e.g., Abarbanel: Selected Commentaries on the Torah: Volume 4: Bamidbar/Numbers. Translated and annotated by Israel Lazar, pages 160–88. Brooklyn: CreateSpace, 2015. .
Obadiah ben Jacob Sforno. Commentary on the Torah. Venice, 1567. In, e.g., Sforno: Commentary on the Torah. Translation and explanatory notes by Raphael Pelcovitz, pages 730–45. Brooklyn: Mesorah Publications, 1997. .
Moshe Alshich. Commentary on the Torah. Safed, circa 1593. In, e.g., Moshe Alshich. Midrash of Rabbi Moshe Alshich on the Torah. Translated and annotated by Eliyahu Munk, volume 3, pages 865–74. New York, Lambda Publishers, 2000. .
Avraham Yehoshua Heschel. Commentaries on the Torah. Cracow, Poland, mid 17th century. Compiled as Chanukat HaTorah. Edited by Chanoch Henoch Erzohn. Piotrkow, Poland, 1900. In Avraham Yehoshua Heschel. Chanukas HaTorah: Mystical Insights of Rav Avraham Yehoshua Heschel on Chumash. Translated by Avraham Peretz Friedman, pages 260–64. Southfield, Michigan: Targum Press/Feldheim Publishers, 2004. .

Thomas Hobbes. Leviathan, 3:38, 40, 42. England, 1651. Reprint edited by C. B. Macpherson, pages 485–86, 505, 563–64. Harmondsworth, England: Penguin Classics, 1982. .
Shabbethai Bass. Sifsei Chachamim. Amsterdam, 1680. In, e.g., Sefer Bamidbar: From the Five Books of the Torah: Chumash: Targum Okelos: Rashi: Sifsei Chachamim: Yalkut: Haftaros, translated by Avrohom Y. Davis, pages 270–327. Lakewood Township, New Jersey: Metsudah Publications, 2013.

Chaim ibn Attar. Ohr ha-Chaim. Venice, 1742. In Chayim ben Attar. Or Hachayim: Commentary on the Torah. Translated by Eliyahu Munk, volume 4, pages 1496–528. Brooklyn: Lambda Publishers, 1999. .
Samson Raphael Hirsch. Horeb: A Philosophy of Jewish Laws and Observances. Translated by Isidore Grunfeld, pages 189–95, 261–65. London: Soncino Press, 1962. Reprinted 2002 . Originally published as Horeb, Versuche über Jissroel's Pflichten in der Zerstreuung. Germany, 1837.

Richard Wagner. Tannhäuser, act 3, scene 3. Dresden, 1845. (a priest's staff blooms anew).
George Eliot. “Janet's Repentance,” chapter 2. In Scenes of Clerical Life. England, 1858. In, e.g., Random House Everyman's Library, 1910, page 236. (“Milby, in those uninstructed days, had not yet heard that the schismatic ministers of Salem were obviously typified by Korah, Dathan, and Abiram”).

Samuel David Luzzatto (Shadal). Commentary on the Torah. Padua, 1871. In, e.g., Samuel David Luzzatto. Torah Commentary. Translated and annotated by Eliyahu Munk, volume 3, pages 1060–71. New York: Lambda Publishers, 2012. .
H. Clay Trumbull. The Salt Covenant. New York, 1899. In Kirkwood, Missouri: Impact Christian Books, 1999. .

Yehudah Aryeh Leib Alter. Sefat Emet. Góra Kalwaria (Ger), Poland, before 1906. Excerpted in The Language of Truth: The Torah Commentary of Sefat Emet. Translated and interpreted by Arthur Green, pages 243–48. Philadelphia: Jewish Publication Society, 1998. . Reprinted 2012. .
Hermann Cohen. Religion of Reason: Out of the Sources of Judaism. Translated with an introduction by Simon Kaplan; introductory essays by Leo Strauss, page 431. New York: Ungar, 1972. Reprinted Atlanta: Scholars Press, 1995. . Originally published as Religion der Vernunft aus den Quellen des Judentums. Leipzig: Gustav Fock, 1919.
Alexander Alan Steinbach. Sabbath Queen: Fifty-four Bible Talks to the Young Based on Each Portion of the Pentateuch, pages 119–22. New York: Behrman's Jewish Book House, 1936.
Julius H. Greenstone. Numbers: With Commentary: The Holy Scriptures, pages 164–200. Philadelphia: Jewish Publication Society, 1939. Reprinted by Literary Licensing, 2011. .

Thomas Mann. Joseph and His Brothers. Translated by John E. Woods, page 55. New York: Alfred A. Knopf, 2005. . Originally published as Joseph und seine Brüder. Stockholm: Bermann-Fischer Verlag, 1943.
A. M. Klein. "Candle Lights." Canada, 1944. In The Collected Poems of A.M. Klein, page 13. Toronto: McGraw-Hill Ryerson, 1974. .
Jacob Milgrom. "First fruits, OT." In The Interpreter's Dictionary of the Bible. Supp. volume, pages 336–37. Nashville, Tennessee: Abingdon, 1976. .
Joseph B. Soloveitchik. "The ‘Common-Sense' Rebellion Against Torah Authority." In Reflection of the Rav: Lessons in Jewish Thought. Adapted by Abraham R. Besdin, pages 139–49. Jerusalem: Department for Torah Education and Culture in the Diaspora of the World Zionist Organization, 1979. In Ktav Publishing, 2nd edition, 1993. .
Philip J. Budd. Word Biblical Commentary: Volume 5: Numbers, pages 178–207. Waco, Texas: Word Books, 1984. .
Pinchas H. Peli. Torah Today: A Renewed Encounter with Scripture, pages 173–75. Washington, D.C.: B'nai B'rith Books, 1987. .
Jacob Milgrom. The JPS Torah Commentary: Numbers: The Traditional Hebrew Text with the New JPS Translation, pages 129–57, 414–36. Philadelphia: Jewish Publication Society, 1990. .
Mark S. Smith. The Early History of God: Yahweh and the Other Deities in Ancient Israel, page 113. New York: HarperSanFrancisco, 1990. ..
Howard Handler. "Pidyon HaBen and Caesarean Sections." New York: Rabbinical Assembly, 1991. YD 305:24.1991. In Responsa: 1991–2000: The Committee on Jewish Law and Standards of the Conservative Movement. Edited by Kassel Abelson and David J. Fine, pages 171–74. New York: Rabbinical Assembly, 2002. .
Baruch A. Levine. Numbers 1–20, volume 4, pages 403–53. New York: Anchor Bible, 1993. .
Gerald Skolnik. "Should There Be a Special Ceremony in Recognition of a Firstborn Female Child?" New York: Rabbinical Assembly, 1993. YD 305:1.1993. In Responsa: 1991–2000: The Committee on Jewish Law and Standards of the Conservative Movement. Edited by Kassel Abelson and David J. Fine, pages 163–65 New York: Rabbinical Assembly, 2002. .
Mary Douglas. In the Wilderness: The Doctrine of Defilement in the Book of Numbers, pages 40, 59, 84, 103, 110–12, 122–23, 125, 130–33, 138, 140, 145, 147, 150, 194–95, 203, 211, 246. Oxford: Oxford University Press, 1993. Reprinted 2004. .
Elliot N. Dorff. "Artificial Insemination, Egg Donation and Adoption." New York: Rabbinical Assembly, 1994. EH 1:3.1994. In Responsa: 1991–2000: The Committee on Jewish Law and Standards of the Conservative Movement. Edited by Kassel Abelson and David J. Fine, pages 461, 497. New York: Rabbinical Assembly, 2002. . (implications of the law of the firstborn son for deciding whether a child born from a donated egg is Jewish).
Judith S. Antonelli. "Korach's Rebellion." In In the Image of God: A Feminist Commentary on the Torah, pages 357–60. Northvale, New Jersey: Jason Aronson, 1995. .
Vernon Kurtz. "Delay of Pidyon HaBen" New York: Rabbinical Assembly, 1995. YD 305:11.1995. In Responsa: 1991–2000: The Committee on Jewish Law and Standards of the Conservative Movement. Edited by Kassel Abelson and David J. Fine, pages 166–70. New York: Rabbinical Assembly, 2002. .
Ellen Frankel. The Five Books of Miriam: A Woman's Commentary on the Torah, pages 220–23. New York: G. P. Putnam's Sons, 1996. .
W. Gunther Plaut. The Haftarah Commentary, pages 366–74. New York: UAHC Press, 1996. .
Sorel Goldberg Loeb and Barbara Binder Kadden. Teaching Torah: A Treasury of Insights and Activities, pages 254–59. Denver: A.R.E. Publishing, 1997. .
Elyse D. Frishman. "Authority, Status, Power." In The Women's Torah Commentary: New Insights from Women Rabbis on the 54 Weekly Torah Portions. Edited by Elyse Goldstein, pages 286–93. Woodstock, Vermont: Jewish Lights Publishing, 2000. .

Dennis T. Olson. "Numbers." In The HarperCollins Bible Commentary. Edited by James L. Mays, pages 175–78. New York: HarperCollins Publishers, revised edition, 2000. .
Elie Wiesel. "Korah." Bible Review, volume 16 (number 3) (June 2000): pages 12–15.
Lainie Blum Cogan and Judy Weiss. Teaching Haftarah: Background, Insights, and Strategies, pages 53–61. Denver: A.R.E. Publishing, 2002. .
Michael Fishbane. The JPS Bible Commentary: Haftarot, pages 233–38. Philadelphia: Jewish Publication Society, 2002. .
Robert Alter. The Five Books of Moses: A Translation with Commentary, pages 762–77. New York: W.W. Norton & Co., 2004. .
Barbara Borts. "Haftarat Korach: I Samuel 11:14–12:22." In The Women's Haftarah Commentary: New Insights from Women Rabbis on the 54 Weekly Haftarah Portions, the 5 Megillot & Special Shabbatot. Edited by Elyse Goldstein, pages 180–84. Woodstock, Vermont: Jewish Lights Publishing, 2004. .
Nili S. Fox. "Numbers." In The Jewish Study Bible. Edited by Adele Berlin and Marc Zvi Brettler, pages 315–21. New York: Oxford University Press, 2004. .
Professors on the Parashah: Studies on the Weekly Torah Reading Edited by Leib Moscovitz, pages 255–66. Jerusalem: Urim Publications, 2005. .
James Findlay. “The Priestly Ideology of the Septuagint Translator of Numbers 16–17.” Journal for the Study of the Old Testament, volume 30 (number 4) (June 2006): pages 421–29.
W. Gunther Plaut. The Torah: A Modern Commentary: Revised Edition. Revised edition edited by David E.S. Stern, pages 1001–21. New York: Union for Reform Judaism, 2006. .
Suzanne A. Brody. "Direct Line to G-d." In Dancing in the White Spaces: The Yearly Torah Cycle and More Poems, page 97. Shelbyville, Kentucky: Wasteland Press, 2007. .
Shai Cherry. "Korah and His Gang." In Torah Through Time: Understanding Bible Commentary, from the Rabbinic Period to Modern Times, pages 132–60. Philadelphia: The Jewish Publication Society, 2007. .
James L. Kugel. How To Read the Bible: A Guide to Scripture, Then and Now, pages 290, 330–34. New York: Free Press, 2007. .
Françoise Mirguet. “Numbers 16: The Significance of Place — An Analysis of Spatial Markers.” Journal for the Study of the Old Testament, volume 32 (number 3) (March 2008): pages 311–30.
The Torah: A Women's Commentary. Edited by Tamara Cohn Eskenazi and Andrea L. Weiss, pages 893–914. New York: URJ Press, 2008. .
R. Dennis Cole. "Numbers." In Zondervan Illustrated Bible Backgrounds Commentary. Edited by John H. Walton, volume 1, pages 363–69. Grand Rapids, Michigan: Zondervan, 2009. .
Reuven Hammer. Entering Torah: Prefaces to the Weekly Torah Portion, pages 219–23. New York: Gefen Publishing House, 2009. .
Jane Rachel Litman. "Torah and Its Discontents: Parashat Korach (Numbers 16:1–18:32)." In Torah Queeries: Weekly Commentaries on the Hebrew Bible. Edited by Gregg Drinkwater, Joshua Lesser, and David Shneer; foreword by Judith Plaskow, pages 202–05. New York: New York University Press, 2009. .
Idan Dershowitz. “A Land Flowing with Fat and Honey.” Vetus Testamentum, volume 60 (number 2) (2010): pages 172–76.
Terence E. Fretheim. "Numbers." In The New Oxford Annotated Bible: New Revised Standard Version with the Apocrypha: An Ecumenical Study Bible. Edited by Michael D. Coogan, Marc Z. Brettler, Carol A. Newsom, and Pheme Perkins, pages 213–17. New York: Oxford University Press, Revised 4th Edition 2010. .
Michal Hunt. "The Pentateuch Part IV: Numbers: Lesson 8: Chapters 16–18: The Kohathite Rebellion. Agape Bible Study, 2010. (Catholic study of Korah.)

The Commentators' Bible: Numbers: The JPS Miqra'ot Gedolot. Edited, translated, and annotated by Michael Carasik, pages 115–37. Philadelphia: Jewish Publication Society, 2011. .
Calum Carmichael. "The Status of the Firstborn (Numbers 16–18)." In The Book of Numbers: A Critique of Genesis, pages 90–102. New Haven: Yale University Press, 2012. .
Shmuel Herzfeld. "Empowerment through Knowledge and Commitment." In Fifty-Four Pick Up: Fifteen-Minute Inspirational Torah Lessons, pages 216–22. Jerusalem: Gefen Publishing House, 2012. .

Shlomo Riskin. Torah Lights: Bemidbar: Trials and Tribulations in Times of Transition, pages 127–52. New Milford, Connecticut: Maggid Books, 2012. .
Josh Feigelson. "Restraining Ambition: How can we each fulfill the uniqueness of our potential, while doing so with humility and a spirit of service?" The Jerusalem Report, volume 24 (number 5) (June 17, 2013): page 45.
Daniel Greyber. "Memory can be redemptive: We remember Korah and his companions to learn from their mistake. By so doing we redeem them, and ourselves." The Jerusalem Report, volume 25 (number 6) (June 30, 2014): page 47.

Jonathan Sacks. Lessons in Leadership: A Weekly Reading of the Jewish Bible, pages 205–09. New Milford, Connecticut: Maggid Books, 2015. .
Avivah Gottlieb Zornberg. Bewilderments: Reflections on the Book of Numbers, pages 170–93. New York: Schocken Books, 2015. .
Jonathan Sacks. Essays on Ethics: A Weekly Reading of the Jewish Bible, pages 239–43. New Milford, Connecticut: Maggid Books, 2016. .
Shai Held. The Heart of Torah, Volume 2: Essays on the Weekly Torah Portion: Leviticus, Numbers, and Deuteronomy, pages 136–45. Philadelphia: Jewish Publication Society, 2017. .
Steven Levy and Sarah Levy. The JPS Rashi Discussion Torah Commentary, pages 127–29. Philadelphia: Jewish Publication Society, 2017. .
Jonathan Sacks. Numbers: The Wilderness Years: Covenant & Conversation: A Weekly Reading of the Jewish Bible, pages 185–233. New Milford, Connecticut: Maggid Books, 2017. .
Bill Dauster. "What Was So Bad About Korach?" Washington Jewish Week, July 4, 2019, page 21.

External links

Texts
Masoretic text and 1917 JPS translation
Hear the parashah chanted 
Hear the parashah read in Hebrew

Commentaries

| width="25%" align="left" valign="top" style="border:0"|
Academy for Jewish Religion, California
Academy for Jewish Religion, New York
Aish.com
Akhlah: The Jewish Children's Learning Network
Aleph Beta Academy
American Jewish University — Ziegler School of Rabbinic Studies
Anshe Emes Synagogue, Los Angeles
Ari Goldwag
Ascent of Safed
Bar-Ilan University
Chabad.org
| width="25%" align="top" style="border:0"|
eparsha.com
G-dcast
The Israel Koschitzky Virtual Beit Midrash
Jewish Agency for Israel
Jewish Theological Seminary
Mechon Hadar
Miriam Aflalo
MyJewishLearning.com
Ohr Sameach
Orthodox Union
OzTorah, Torah from Australia
Oz Ve Shalom — Netivot Shalom
| width="25%" align="top" style="border:0"|
Pardes from Jerusalem
Professor James L. Kugel
Professor Michael Carasik
Rabbi Fabian Werbin
Rabbi Jonathan Sacks
RabbiShimon.com
Rabbi Shlomo Riskin
Rabbi Shmuel Herzfeld
Rabbi Stan Levin
Reconstructionist Judaism 
Sephardic Institute
Shiur.com
| width="25%" align="top" style="border:0"|
613.org Jewish Torah Audio
Tanach Study Center
TheTorah.com
Torah from Dixie
Torah.org
TorahVort.com
Union for Reform Judaism
United Synagogue of Conservative Judaism
What's Bothering Rashi?
Yeshiva University
Yeshivat Chovevei Torah

Weekly Torah readings in Sivan
Weekly Torah readings in Tammuz (Hebrew month)
Weekly Torah readings from Numbers